Robert Stokes (1809 – 20 January 1880) practised briefly as an architect in England in the 1830s before emigrating to New Zealand, where he had a varied career as a land surveyor, a newspaper proprietor and latterly as a member of the New Zealand Legislative Council. The Lower Hutt suburb of Stokes Valley in New Zealand commemorates his name.

Origins 

Stokes was born in Jamaica on 16 January 1809, the son of Robert Stokes (then chief clerk in the Post Office in Jamaica) and of Martha Frances Stokes.

Architectural career 

Stokes registered as a probationer student of architecture at the Royal Academy Schools in January 1830, entering on the recommendation of Sir Francis Chantrey, the leading portrait sculptor of the Regency period. He had exhibited student work at the Royal Academy in the late 1820s. Admitted to full studentship in June 1830, he was awarded a silver medal that year. He appears not to have completed the usual number of years as a student, because by 1831, he had moved to Cheltenham, where the Pittville estate was under active development by its eponymous promoter, Joseph Pitt. There is some indication that Chantrey knew Pitt, and this possibly accounts for Stokes taking up work in Cheltenham. In 1832, while resident in Cheltenham, he married Margaret Pughe, daughter of the late Rev Lewis Pughe of Liverpool. Stokes worked for Pitt for a number of years, designing the Tudor Gothic-style Female Orphan Asylum in Winchcombe Street and the ornamental Pittville Gates, both of 1833, which formed part of Pitt's plan to make Winchcombe Street a 'grand entrance' route to his new estate; Stokes also worked on several of the larger private houses in Pittville. He parted company with Pitt in 1835, apparently in financial difficulties, but resided in Cheltenham a little longer. His only other recorded architectural works in England are the Gothic churches at Amberley (1836) and Oakridge (1835–1837), both in Gloucestershire. After his migration to New Zealand, he produced the design for a Wesleyan Chapel (fronted in the classical style) and mission house, built 1844 in Manners Street, Wellington. The chapel did not survive the 1848 earthquake.

Career in public life in New Zealand 

On 10 April 1839 he approached the New Zealand Company for a position, and was attached to Mein Smith's survey staff. He sailed for New Zealand on the Cuba, arriving at Port Nicholson on 3 January 1840. During the next few months he carried out surveys in the Wellington-Hutt Valley district, where he gave his name to Stokes Valley. Early in 1842 he resigned from the Company to enter business on his own account. He was never afraid of voicing his opinion on public affairs, and his first 'letters to the editor' appeared in 1840–41, on the subject of better ways of preventing cattle straying onto cultivated land – in particular his acre near the harbour in Wellington. He was one of the co-founders of the New Zealand Spectator and Cook's Straits Guardian, and was active as a publisher of newspapers and books until at least 1865. He was appointed as a Justice of the Peace in 1861, and continued in this office until at least 1866.
Stokes represented Wellington City in the Provincial Council from 1857 to 1865 and Wairarapa East from then until 1867. In 1858 he carried a Bill through the Council to establish municipal government for Wellington and, in the same year, advocated the construction of a railway across the Rimutaka Range. Although his scheme was derided at first (the line required some challenging inclines), Stokes continued his agitation. In 1863 he induced the Council to agree to accept Robert Mudge Marchant's tender to build the first 18 miles of the line for £150,000, but the deal fell through. Four years later Stokes endeavoured to revive the project, but nothing was done until Vogel incorporated it in his public works scheme of the early 1870s. Stokes was summoned to the New Zealand Legislative Council in 1862, serving from 12 July 1862 to 24 September 1879 when he was disqualified for absence (he had returned to England in poor health). From 1871 to 1878 he was a member of the Senate of the University of New Zealand. In the Legislative Council he became well known for his forthright opinions on the major political issues of the day. Notwithstanding his extensive interests in Hawke's Bay, Stokes continued to reside in Wellington. He was one of the Commissioners for the Wellington City Reserves in 1862. He was also active in church affairs, serving for a time as a lay member of the Synod of the Diocese of Wellington. Throughout his life he gave much encouragement to agriculture and by 1842 and for some years after, was treasurer of the Wellington Horticultural and Botanical Society. His first wife Margaret died after a long illness at Te Aro on 1 August 1852.

Return to England 

In 1878, in his late sixties, he returned to England, and on 19 September that year married Jane Rutherford, daughter of the late John Rutherford of Aberdeen, at St Mary Abbots, Kensington, London. He died at his London residence, 1 Clanricarde Gardens, Bayswater on 20 January 1880, having been in failing health due to cancer for several years, and was buried in Kensal Green cemetery. He left no family; his estate consisted mainly of his New Zealand properties (nearly 30,000 acres), held jointly with his brother Dr John Milbourne Stokes, who also died in 1880 (John had come to New Zealand as a surgeon on the Aurora in 1840). Three-sevenths of the estate went to his widow Jane, and John's four-sevenths went to 13 charitable institutions in England and Napier, New Zealand. In 1889–90 his widow presented a large stained-glass window in Stokes's memory to the chancel of Napier cathedral; designed by Nathaniel Westlake, it was described at the time as "the largest and finest window of the kind in the southern Colonies, covering five lancets", the middle one over 25 feet high, and containing over 200 figures. This was lost when the cathedral was destroyed by earthquake in 1931.
His widow Jane remarried in June 1890 Captain Ralph Slazenger.

References 

1809 births
1880 deaths
Members of the New Zealand Legislative Council
19th-century New Zealand architects
19th-century New Zealand politicians
Members of the Wellington Provincial Council